1905 in philosophy

Events

Publications

Births 
 February 2 - Ayn Rand (died 1982)
 June 21 - Jean-Paul Sartre (died 1980)
January 8 - Carl Gustav Hempel (died 1997)

Deaths 
January 19 – Debendranath Tagore, Indian philosopher and author (b. 1817)

References 

Philosophy
20th-century philosophy
Philosophy by year